Possum Head is an album by jazz saxophonist Lou Donaldson recorded for the Argo label in 1964 and performed by Donaldson with trumpeter  Bill Hardman, organist “Big” John Patton, guitarist  Ray Crawford, drummer Ben Dixon and percussionist Cleopas Morris.

Reception
The album was awarded 4 stars in an Allmusic review by Jason Ankeny who states "Patton's sublimely funky grooves effectively sand away Donaldson's wooden edges to create rolling melodic contours... Donaldson circles around the hard-driving soul-jazz sensibilities of his later records but never quite commits, instead favoring lyrical solos well-matched to standards... An engaging and underrated record".

Track listing
All compositions by Lou Donaldson except as indicated
 "Possum Head" - 3:15  
 "Laura" (David Raksin) - 4:42  
 "Midnight Soul" - 4:57 
 "Bye Bye Blackbird" (Mort Dixon, Ray Henderson) - 6:28  
 "Persimmon Tree" - 5:35
 "Frenesí" (Alberto Dominguez, Leonard Whitcup) - 6:15  
 "Man with a Horn" (Eddie DeLange, Jack Jenney, Bonnie Lake) - 5:04     
 "Secret Love" (Sammy Fain, Paul Francis Webster) - 5:43

Personnel
Lou Donaldson - alto saxophone  
Bill Hardman - trumpet 
Ray Crawford - guitar 
Big John Patton - organ 
Ben Dixon - drums 
Cleopas "Mopedido" Morris - percussion

References

Lou Donaldson albums
1964 albums
Albums produced by Esmond Edwards
Argo Records albums